Old Bay Seasoning is a blend of herbs and spices that is marketed in the United States by McCormick & Company and originally created in Baltimore, Maryland.

The seasoning is a mix of celery salt (salt, celery seed), spices (including red pepper and black pepper) and paprika.  Some of the other spices that may be used are laurel leaves, mustard, cardamom, cloves and ginger as listed in the original product in the Baltimore Museum of Industry. It is regionally popular, specifically in Maryland, as well as in the Mid-Atlantic States, the Southern States, parts of New England and the Gulf Coast.

History

Old Bay Seasoning is named after the Old Bay Line, a passenger ship line that plied the waters of the Chesapeake Bay from Baltimore to Norfolk, Virginia, in the early 1900s. In 1939, a Jewish-German immigrant named Gustav Brunn started the Baltimore Spice Company.

The origins of the company can be traced back to Wertheim, Germany, where Brunn started a wholesale spice and seasoning business selling to food industries, seeing an opportunity as spices were in especially short supply amidst hyperinflation in the aftermath of World War I. Due to rising antisemitism as the Nazi Party rose to power, the company moved to Frankfurt, Germany; however, on the night of November 9, 1938, a massive pogrom against Jews, known as Kristallnacht, led to Brunn being arrested by Nazi soldiers and sent to Buchenwald concentration camp.

According to Brunn's son, Gustav's wife paid a large sum of money to a lawyer for him to be released; as they had already applied for and received American visas, they were able to escape with their two children to New York City and later Baltimore, Maryland, where Brunn had family. There, having brought with him only a small spice grinder, Brunn founded the Baltimore Spice Company and produced the "Delicious Brand Shrimp and Crab Seasoning", which was later renamed Old Bay.
In an interesting twist of history and fate, the ship depicted in some of the advertising was the Old Bay Line steamer President Warfield, which would later be known under the name Exodus.

The rights to the seasoning brand were purchased by McCormick & Co in 1990. McCormick continued to offer Old Bay in the classic yellow can.

McCormick has a number of other products under the Old Bay banner, including seasoning packets for crab cakes, salmon patties and tuna, tartar sauce, cocktail sauce and seafood batter mix. They also make other seasoning blends that mix Old Bay seasoning with garlic, lemon, brown sugar, herbs, and blackened seasonings. McCormick has offered a lower-sodium version of Old Bay Seasoning.

In 2017, McCormick changed the packaging from metal cans to plastic containers in an effort to reduce the packaging costs.

Usage

The seasoning is chiefly used to season crab and shrimp. It is used in various clam chowder and oyster stew recipes. The seasoning is also used as a topping on popcorn, salads, eggs, fried chicken, chicken wings, french fries, tater tots, corn on the cob, boiled peanuts, dips, chipped beef, baked potatoes, potato salad, potato chips and guacamole. Several movie theaters in the Chesapeake region offer it in the condiment section.

Potato chip manufacturer Utz created the original "Crab Chip" based on a similar mix of spices. The popular potato chip variety was later copied and marketed by Herr's Snacks (however, Herr's uses Old Bay seasoning and it is sold as "Herr's Old Bay Chips"). Lay's introduced its own Old Bay-seasoned "Chesapeake Bay Crab Spice" flavored chips in 2018.

Early in its history, the Subway sandwich shop used Old Bay when mixing their seafood and crab salad. Many local Subway shops still have Old Bay for use on sandwiches. Convenience store chain Sheetz also offers Old Bay as an option in its delis due to their large presence in the Mid-Atlantic region, including areas beyond Old Bay's traditional territory.

Old Bay is also occasionally used around the Chesapeake Bay region as an ingredient in Bloody Marys, and even in places as far south as The Breakers Hotel in Palm Beach, Florida. Some bars in the Baltimore region also often sell what is known as a 'Crabby Bo', which is National Bohemian beer where the lip of the glass or mug being used is moistened and dipped into a container of Old Bay seasoning. In 2014, the Maryland-based brewery Flying Dog created an Old Bay-inspired summer ale named Dead Rise to celebrate the seasoning's 75th anniversary.

In 2020, McCormick created Old Bay Hot Sauce in advance of the Super Bowl, which initially sold out within 30 minutes of its launch and caused the Old Bay website to crash temporarily. Some customers resold the  bottles, retailing for $3.49, online for between $50 to $200. In 2022, the company collaborated with Pepperidge Farm to produce Old Bay-flavored Goldfish crackers. The crackers sold out online within nine hours. 

In June 2021, Old Bay worked with the True Temper Sports company and released a lacrosse stick with an Old Bay decal, both in the standard short and defensive long lengths. Both sticks are currently sold out online.

See also

References

External links
 Old Bay Seasoning – official website

Cuisine of Baltimore
German-Jewish culture in Baltimore
Herb and spice mixtures
Jewish-American history
Maryland cuisine
Products introduced in 1939
Trade secrets
McCormick & Company brands
Celery